Andrea Shundi (born 15 November 1934) is an Albanian-American agronomist of the 20th and 21st century. His academic research and publications focus mainly on the forage systems as a source feeding of the livestock, on viticulture and viniculture, and also on the history of the Albanian agriculture.

One of the main authors of university level textbooks in Albania and lecturer and then dean at the Faculty of Agriculture of the Agricultural University of Tirana, Shundi has also been an active participant in many international conferences and symposia on forage systems and viticulture. He has often lectured in Italian and Greek agricultural universities as a guest. Along Mentor Përmeti he has been the organiser of the first pan Albanian conference on Agriculture scientific work in 1975 and in 1991 he was the organiser of the second and last conference of that level.

Life and works

Early years and scientific work in Albania
Andrea Shundi was born on November 15, 1934, in Tirana, Albania. After finishing high school in his native city, he attended the Agricultural University of Tirana, where he pursued studies in Agronomy and graduated in 1956. From 1956 to 1960 Shundi was a researcher at the Institute of Agricultural Research in Lushnje. In 1960-1962 he was chief agronomist of the Agricultural Cooperative of Krutje, Lushnje, and in 1962-1964 he was Chief Agronomist  of the Agricultural Department of the Lushnje District. During the 1956-1964 period he conducted experiments and published studies on the periods, depth, and tillage methods for the main types of the arable lands and for each climatic zone of Albania. At that time Shundi was also basketball as well as volleyball player/coach of the polisports' club of the city of Lushnja, KS Traktori, which then played in the respective Albanian Basketball League and the Albanian Volleyball Leagues, the highest national divisions.

During the 1964-1975 period Shundi was Director of the Livestock Feeds, Field Crops and Scientific Research Department in the Ministry of Agriculture of Albania. In this period Shundi's research work focused on forage systems, used for a coordinated development of the sources of the forage crop production. The main objective of the forage systems is the natural integration of all the forage sources of feeding the livestock: the annual and perennial plants of the arable lands, the forage crops, the forest and fruit trees, and shrubs. Shundi introduced the forage systems in his monograph, the Bimët Foragjere në Zonën e Ftohtë, which was published in Tirana in 1974. A much larger republication of the book was done 30 years later, in 2004.

From 1975 to 1976 Shundi was director of the Agriculture Department of the Kukës District, and during the 1976-1980 period he was the director of the Seed Enterprise of Tirana. In 1980-1992 he was first a professor, and then dean of the Agricultural Faculty of the Agricultural University of Tirana. During this period the main research of Shundi focused on the coordination of plant cultivation and consociation of plant cultivation A third concept was introduced by Shundi in the Albanian agriculture, the Coefficient of Land Usage (CLU), which is a measuring indicator that determines the degree of intensity of use of agricultural land through plant cultivation. The CLU includes units of mass, area, money, and time (usually ton per ha/$/days) and is used for both the coordination and the consociation of plant cultivation.

During 1994-1998 he was scientific secretary of the Natural and Technical Sciences Section of the Academy of Sciences of Albania.

Migration to the United States and work (1998-present)
Shundi retired from the Academy of Sciences in 1998, and migrated to the United States where he became a citizen. There he continued to write books on the forage systems with the Albanian peculiarities, but also started to focus on the history of the Albanian agriculture on the whole, and the Albanian viticulture and viniculture in particular.

In his writings Shundi describes the history of the Albanian agriculture, which is a main part of the history of the Albanian people. His book, Bujqësia dhe Veprimi Agronomik në Troje Shqiptare (2001), was the first historical book ever published on the history of the Albanian agriculture. The books chronologically focuses from the Neolithic Age until the 20th century. Shundi's second book on the history of the Albanian agriculture, Historia e Bujqësisë dhe Agroindustrisë Shqiptare (2003) focuses on Medieval, Ottoman Albania, and Albanian National Awakening period, encompassing a period from the 6th to the 19th centuries. Another chapter of the book, written by Shundi, covers the history of agricultural education and scientific research in Albania. His third book on the history of the Albanian agriculture, Jetë Agronomike (2004), focuses on the history of Albanian agriculture in the second half of the 20th century. Professor Velesin Peçuli, then Rector of the Agricultural University of Tirana prefaced the book where he points out rigorous scientific work of Shundi.

After 10 monographs on the forage crops, in 2004 Shundi published the Bimët Foragjere në Zonën e Ftohtë.(). The book is accompanied by a technical explanatory vocabulary of key words and technical terms.

From 2001 to 2010 Shundi also published 6 books on viticulture and viniculture. Vreshtaria Praktike.(), published in 2001, was praised in its preface by Italian academic Eugenio Sartori as a good omen for the Albanian viticulture, which has a long tradition. The book was followed by another publication, in 2004, Vreshtaria dhe Verëtaria Shqiptare,, which was prefaced by Albanian professor, Moikom Zeqo. Zeqo calls the book a synthesis of both an old and a young mentality for the viticulture and viniculture. In addition, he describes the book as a testimony to the Albanian culture on wine, as a subtract of a larger Mediterranean wine culture. The book is in Albanian with a partial translation into English. In 2006 Shundi published Fjalor Shtjellues për Vreshtarinë dhe Verëtarinë.(), prefaced by the Albanian linguist, head of the coordinating group of the Albanian Encyclopaedia, Emil Lafe, who praises the book as a mature work that spans on the linguistic side as well as on the Agricultural one. The book includes terms and proverbs used in  Arvanitic, Cham Albanian, and Arbëreshë, as well as terms in Gheg Albanian, which are not commonly used in today's Albanian, and thus attempts to include all the linguistic riches of the Albanian language.

In 2008 Shundi published Prodhimi Shtëpiak i Rrushit dhe Verës , prefaced by well known Albanian professor Aleko Minga, who described the book as a great means of diffusion of the Albanian agricultural culture. In 2010 Shundi published two additional books, Fjalor Enciklopedik per Vreshtarinë dhe Verëtarinë, prefaced by Prof. Resmi Osmani. The following book, called Vreshta dhe Kantina Shqiptare,, includes a description of the most successful Albanian vineyards and cantines in Albanian, Kosovo, Macedonia, and Montenegro.

Shundi is widely cited by his peers such as by Lush Susaj, Professor at the Agricultural University of Tirana, Vineyards Cultivation, Tirana 2009, Kosovan professor and academic Latif Susuri Dictionary: Plants, Parasytes, Pathogens Prishtina 2005, Dictionary of Agricultural and Forestry Plants, and Weeds, Prishtina 2006, Professor Fatmir Voci in his Practices of Viticulture, 2007 (FAO Project), and Velesin Peculi in his Organic Agriculture Tirana 2005.

Agricultural Conferences Organiser
Shundi has been an organiser and coordinator of 11 national meetings on the agricultural science. Along with academic Mentor Përmeti he organised in 1975 an Albanian National Conference on Agricultural Sciences. Shundi organised a second national conference of this dimension 1991, called Agriculture under the new economical Developments in Albania, and focused on the major economic transformations of the Albanian agriculture following the transitory period of the History of post-Communist Albania.

In addition to these major conferences dedicated to the Albanian agriculture as a whole, Shundi also organised every year 9 pan-Albanian conferences on viticulture and viniculture in Albania and Kosovo in the 2001-2010 period.

Participation in International Congresses
Shundi took papers in the following international congresses and symposia:
Five professional delegations of Albania at the Food and Agriculture Organization's General World or European meetings (in 1973, 1980, 1981, 1985, and 1987).
Symposium of the Italian Association of the Agronomy (Potenza Italy, 1991)
Symposium of the European Network of the Food and Agriculture Organization (Nitra, Slovakia, 1992)
International Symposium on forages organised by the Mediterranean Agronomic Institute (Bari Italy, 1992)
Symposium of the European Network of the FAO on the forages (Montpellier, France, 1987)
XVIIth International Grassland Congress (Palmerston North, New Zealand 1993)
Symposium of the European Network of the Food and Agriculture Organizationon forages (Chania, Greece, 1993)
Vth International Congress on forages (Salt Lake City, USA, 1995)
Symposium of the Italian Association of forests and the Italian Minister of Agriculture (Verona, Italy, 1996)
VIth International Congress on forages (Townsville, Australia, 1999)
Five international conferences on viticulture and viniculture organised by world's largest grapevine nursery Vivai Cooperativi Rauscedo during the (1997–2007) period (two in Italy, one in Bordeaux, France, one in Athens, Greece, and one in Porto, Portugal)

Memberships
Shundi was Albanian representative of the European Federation for Forage Plants during the 1995–1999 period, a board member of the TEMPUS project for Albania, organised by the EU during the 1991–1992 period. He was elected head of the Albanian association of the agronomists in 1991. A board member of the Committee of Science and Technics in Albania in the 1990–1992 period, a board member in the Albanian National Commission for Scientific Post Doc qualification in the 1990–1992 period.

Earlier he was a board member of the scientific councils of the Agricultural University of Tirana (1987–1992), and president of the Scientific Council of the Faculty of Agronomy (1984–1992). He was also member of the scientific councils of the Fan Noli University (1987–1992), the Institute of Forage Research in Fushë-Krujë, (1984–1992), the Institute of Agricultural Research in Lushnje (1978–1987).

Acknowledgements and awards
In September 2008 the Ministry of Agriculture of Kosovo recognised the work of Shundi through an acknowledgement of the contributions in the scientific work in the field of viticulture and viniculture. On November 1, 2010, Shundi was awarded the medal of Grand Master of Work from the President of Albania, Bamir Topi with the following motivation:<ref name="President of Albania website">{{cite web|last=President of Albania|title=Presidenti Topi dekoron Prof. Andrea Shundi me Urdhrin "Mjeshtër i Madh.|url=http://www.president.al/shqip/info.asp?id=6223|date=1 November 2010|access-date=30 January 2011|archive-url=https://web.archive.org/web/20101127050352/http://president.al/shqip/info.asp?id=6223|archive-date=27 November 2010|url-status=dead}}</ref>

In December 2010 the Association of the Agricultural Journalists of Albania acknowledged the work of Shundi for "important contributions in research and publications in the field of agronomy of Albania".

List of Publications

Dr. Shundi has published the following from 1969 through 2017:

Monographs
2017 Hortikultura: vështrim enciklopedik, published by the Academy of Sciences of Albania and co-authored with Nazim Gruda. The book includes 4,600 scientific terms and around 1,000 synonyms. In the Albanian language is one of the most detailed and important publications on horticulture. The book was presented on June 2, 2017, in a symposium by the Academy, which highlighted the originality of the included content.
2016 E(t)nogastronomia Arbëreshe, published by Vllamasi Publishing House Tirana), also published by Rubbettino Editore (Cosenza) in Italian in 2017. In it are included 610 dish recipes and 30 types of arbëresh wines. The volume also includes a glossary in Arbëresh-Albanian-Italian and 620 Arbëresh proverbs on wine making and ethnogastronomy.
2012 Enciklopedi për Vreshtarinë dhe Verëtarinë, published by Vllamasi Publishing House Tirana. This 870 pages book includes 3,200 articles and 3,800 synonyms that focus on wine and winemaking terminology in the Albanian language, as well as Albanian 750 proverbs from all Albanian-inhabited areas. The book was reviewed by linguists Emil Lafe and Jorgo Bulo.
2012 Wisdom From Vine And Wine - 600 proverbs and stories on viti-viniculture with technical interpretations. 
2010 Fjalor Enciklopedik per Vreshtarinë dhe Verëtarinë Dita 2000 Publishing House
2010 Vreshta dhe Kantina Shqiptare
2009 Fjalori Enciklopedik Shqiptar - author of 15 articles in the Academy of Sciences of Albania encyclopedia
2008 Prodhimi Shtëpiak i Rrushit dhe Verës  Onufri Publishing House 2008
2006 Fjalor Shtjellues për Vreshtarinë dhe Verëtarinë.()
2004 Vreshtaria dhe Verëtaria Shqiptare,
2004 Bimët Foragjere në Zonën e Ftohtë First publication, in a shorter form was in 1974.
2004 Jetë Agronomike
2003 Historia e Bujqësisë dhe Agroindustrisë Shqiptare
2001 Vreshtaria Praktike
2001 Bujqësia dhe Veprimi Agronomik në Troje Shqiptare
1990 Shtimi i Bashkëshoqërimeve dhe i Koeficientit të Përdorimit të Tokës me Bimësi Foragjere()
1990 Development of Agriculture in Albania1988 Bashkërendime të Agroteknologjisë me Biologjinë e Selitjes së Bimëve()
1985 Fjalori Enciklopedik Shqiptar  - author of 8 articles
1984 Agroteknologji dhe Veçori të Prodhimit Foragjer
1981 Përmirësime Agronomike në Prodhimin e Hasëlleve
1974 Prodhimi Intensiv nga Bimësia Foragjere dhe Blegtoria
1970 Probleme në Bazën Ushqimore të Blegtorisë
1969 Prodhimi i Bimësisë Foragjere
1969 Doracak për Sistemimin e Tokave

University textbooks
1988 Bimët Foragjere
1984 Bujqësia e Përgjithëshme dhe Bimët Foragjere
1984 Përgjithësime Ligjësish dhe Parametrash për Selitjen e Bimëve të Arave
1983 and 1988 Ligjërata për Prodhimin Foragjer Intensiv
1980 and 1987 Fitoteknia
1974 and 1982 Bimët e Arave
1974 Bazat e Bujqësisë

Booklets
1965–1981 8 booklets on the foraging systems

Scientific articles published in technical journals
1958–1999 134 technical and scientific articles, published in Albanian and international journals such as HERBA (FAOs journal), MEDIT (Agronomic Institute of the Mediterranean, published in Bari, Italy), DAEDALUS (University of Cosenza, Italy), Irrigazione e Drenaggio'' (Bologna-Italy). Among these publications it is worthy mentioning the contribution in the fifth international rangeland congress Rangelands in a Sustainable Biosphere Proceedings of the Fifth International Rangelands Congress Contributed Presentations pps. 512-513
1958–1964 18 articles on the soil tillage systems and the seeds' selection.

See also
Albanian wine

References

Sources
 
 
 
 
 
 
 
 

1934 births
People from Tirana
Albanian agronomists
American agronomists
American people of Albanian descent
Living people
Academic staff of the Agricultural University of Tirana
Agricultural University of Tirana alumni
20th-century Albanian scientists
21st-century Albanian scientists